Charles Robertson Maier, C StJ, CD, FRSA, FHSC,(born 1945) is the current Priory Historian for St John Ambulance, The Priory of Canada.

Maier was born in St Louis, Missouri in 1945. He received a Bachelor of Arts in 1969 from the University of British Columbia and a Master of Arts in 1970 from King's College London, University of London. He was an archivist for the Yukon Territory until the foundation of the Canadian Heraldic Authority in 1988 when he was commissioned Athabaska Herald. He was made a fellow of the Royal Heraldry Society of Canada in 1991.  He was promoted Commander of the Order of St John in 2005.

References 
Heraldry:The Officers and Heralds of Arms and their Armorial Bearings
Fellows of the Royal Heraldry Society of Canada
Canada Gazette Vol. 140, No. 17 — April 29, 2006

1945 births
Living people
20th-century Canadian historians
Canadian male non-fiction writers
Alumni of King's College London
21st-century Canadian historians